Gastón Gaudio was the defending singles champion of the Torneo Godó men's tennis tournament, but lost in the quarterfinals this year.

Carlos Moyá won the singles title at the 2003 Torneo Godó tennis tournament, defeating Marat Safin, who retired while Moyá held a 5–7, 6–2, 6–2, 3–0 lead in the final.

Seeds

Draw

Finals

Top half

Section 1

Section 2

Bottom half

Section 3

Section 4

References

External links
 Main draw

Singles
2003 ATP Tour